The 2021 CAF Women's Champions League COSAFA Qualifiers was the 1st edition of the CAF Women's Champions League COSAFA Qualifiers, a women's club football championship organised by the COSAFA for the women's clubs of association nations. This edition was held from 26 August–4 September 2021 in South Africa.

The winner of the tournament will qualify for the inaugural 2021 CAF Women's Champions League which will held later this year.

Participating teams

The following seven teams will contest in the league. Costa do Sol FC from Mozambique was not selected by CAF. CAF has decided to reject the club's license for failing to meet the criteria for this competition.

Venue
Matches will held at the King Zwelithini Stadium in Durban, South Africa.

Match officials

Referees
 Letticia Viana (Eswatini)
 Antsino Twanyanyukwa (Namibia)
 Itumeleng Methikga (Botswana)
 Nteboheleng Setoko (Lesotho)
 Patience Mumba (Zambia)

Assistant Referees
 Botsalo Mosimanewatlala (Botswana)
 Mercy Zulu (Zambia)
 Nobuhle Tsokela (South Africa) 
 Polotso Maapara (Lesotho)
 Eliza Sichinga (Malawi)
 Siphiwayikhosi Cosma Nxumalo (Eswatini)

Draw
The draw ceremony of the championship were held on 29 July 2021 11:00 local time at Johannesburg, South Africa.

Group summary

Group stage

Tiebreakers
Teams are ranked according to points (3 points for a win, 1 point for a draw, 0 points for a loss), and if tied on points, the following tiebreaking criteria are applied, in the order given, to determine the rankings.
Points in head-to-head matches among tied teams;
Goal difference in head-to-head matches among tied teams;
Goals scored in head-to-head matches among tied teams;
If more than two teams are tied, and after applying all head-to-head criteria above, a subset of teams are still tied, all head-to-head criteria above are reapplied exclusively to this subset of teams;
Goal difference in all group matches;
Goals scored in all group matches;
Penalty shoot-out if only two teams are tied and they met in the last round of the group;
Disciplinary points (yellow card = 1 point, red card as a result of two yellow cards = 3 points, direct red card = 3 points, yellow card followed by direct red card = 4 points);
Drawing of lots.

All times are South African Standard Time (UTC+2).

Group A
<onlyinclude>

Group B

Knockout stage

Bracket
In the knockout stage, extra-time and a penalty shoot-out will be used to decide the winner if necessary.

Semi-finals

Final

Statistics

Goalscorers

References

External links 
COSAFA Official Website

2021 CAF Women's Champions League
Women's Champions League
COSAFA